For chemical reactions, the zinc–zinc oxide cycle or Zn–ZnO cycle is a two step thermochemical cycle based on zinc and zinc oxide for hydrogen production with a typical efficiency around 40%.

Process description
The thermochemical two-step water splitting process uses redox systems:

Dissociation: ZnO → Zn + 1/2 O2
Hydrolysis: Zn + H2O → ZnO + H2

For the first endothermic step concentrating solar power is used in which zinc oxide is thermally dissociated at  into zinc and oxygen. The temperature level is realized by using a solar power tower and a set of heliostats to collect the solar thermal energy.

See also
 Cerium(IV) oxide–cerium(III) oxide cycle
 Copper–chlorine cycle
 Hydrosol-2
 Hybrid sulfur cycle
 Iron oxide cycle
 Sulfur–iodine cycle

References

External links
 H2 formation by zinc hydrolysis in a hot wall aerosol flow reactor

Chemical reactions
Hydrogen production
Zinc
Zinc oxide